Tetrakis(trimethylsilyl)silane is the organosilicon compound with the formula (Me3Si)4Si (where Me = CH3).  It is a colorless sublimable solid with a high melting point.  The molecule has tetrahedral symmetry.  The compound is notable as having silicon bonded to four other silicon atoms, like in elemental silicon.

Preparation and reactions
The compound is prepared by the reaction of trimethylsilyl chloride, silicon tetrachloride, and lithium:
4 Me3SiCl  +  SiCl4  +  8 Li  →  (Me3Si)4Si +  8 LiCl

The compound is a precursor to tris(trimethylsilyl)silyl lithium by reaction with methyl lithium:
(Me3Si)4Si  +  MeLi  →  (Me3Si)3SiLi  +  Me4Si
The organolithium compound (Me3Si)3SiLi is a versatile reagent, e.g. to tris(trimethylsilyl)silane ((Me3Si)3SiH).

See also
 Tris(trimethylsilyl)methane

References

Carbosilanes
Trimethylsilyl compounds